Diana Olsson (born 28 August 1957) is a former Swedish backstroke swimmer. Olsson participated in the 1972 Summer Olympics and in the 1976 Summer Olympics competing in freestyle, backstroke and relay events. Her best individual Olympic result is a 25th place in the 100 m backstroke 1972.

Clubs
Stockholmspolisens IF

References

1957 births
Swedish female backstroke swimmers
Swedish female freestyle swimmers
Living people
Swimmers at the 1972 Summer Olympics
Swimmers at the 1976 Summer Olympics
Olympic swimmers of Sweden
European Aquatics Championships medalists in swimming
20th-century Swedish women